Panorama is a suburb of Adelaide, South Australia, in the City of Mitcham.

History
Originally named "Spring Hill" because of the Naturally occurring Spring located in the Hills behind it, the name was changed to Panorama after the Affluent Residents of "Springfield" complained that the name was too similar to their own and was the cause of much confusion. 
Panorama Post Office opened on 1 August 1947 and was renamed Pasadena in 1982.

References

Suburbs of Adelaide